Gwangju station is a train station located in Gwangju, South Korea, 353 km south of Yongsan station.

History
The station opened on July 1, 1922, and the station building was moved to its present location on July 25, 1969.

On August 10, 2000, Gwangju station was disconnected from the Gyeongjeon Line when a southern bypass between Hyocheon and Songjeong-ri (today GwangjuSongjeong Station) was opened. The section between Songjeong-ri and Gwangju remained in use as the Gwangju Line, a spur with Gwangju station as its terminal station.

Gwangju station was opened on July 1, 1922 as a regular station in Daein-dong, Gwangju, and served as an important transportation role for Kwang-si until April 1, 2004. Currently, KTX operation is in charge of GwangjuSongjeong Station, and Gwangju station serves Mugunghwa-ho & ITX-Saemaeul services.

Images

See also
Transportation in South Korea
Korail
Korea Train Express

References

External links
Korea Train eXpress
Route Map

Korea Train Express stations
Railway stations in Gwangju
Railway stations opened in 1922